Burmagomphus sivalikensis is a species of dragonfly in the family Gomphidae. It is endemic to India.

References

Sources

Gomphidae
Insects described in 1922
Taxonomy articles created by Polbot